The 2019–20 season was Società Sportiva Dilettantistica Palermo's 1st season in Serie D, the fourth-highest division of Italian football, in their history, after the exclusion of the club from Serie B in summer 2019. However, this was the second time that Palermo participated in the fourth division: in the 1987–88 season the sicilian club played in Serie C2, after a year passed outside of any football league, because of bankruptcy in 1986.

Season review
Following Palermo's exclusion from Serie B, a phoenix club was established under the Article 52 of N.O.I.F. regulations, with Mayor of Palermo Leoluca Orlando responsible to choose the next ownership. On 24 July 2019, Mayor Orlando confirmed six declarations of interests had been presented on that regard; those included offers by Massimo Ferrero (Sampdoria owner and chairman), Lebanese-Swiss-English fund Zurich Capital Funds, fashion multinational company Capri srl, and a joint one by Dario Mirri (Palermo-based marketing entrepreneur, and nephew of historical club chairman Renzo Barbera) and Tony DiPiazza (Sicilian-American real estate mogul).

The next day, Orlando announced to have chosen "Hera Hora srl", the joint Mirri-DiPiazza proposal, as the new owners.

Under the new conditions, Hera Hora srl will control 90% of the new club, with a 10% to be specifically dedicated for a supporters' trust as specifically requested by the City of Palermo. Regarding Hera Hora srl (the controlling company of the new club), Mirri will personally control 10% of it, Damir srl (Mirri's main business company) 50%, and DiPiazza 40%. The new owners will also be supported by Rinaldo Sagramola, former Palermo managing director during the early Zamparini years (2004–2012), who will serve again in such role. As stated in their business plan, the new ownership plans to bring Palermo back to Serie A within three years, organize a women's football section (by means of acquisition and integration of an already existing local team), relaunch the youth system also through a collaboration with the minor local teams, open a club museum and build a new training centre nearby the stadium area.

On 3 August 2019, as part of the inaugural press conference, the club announced the new managerial staff, featuring Renzo Castagnini (former Sagramola collaborator) as sporting director and Rosario Pergolizzi (former Palermo youth coach) as head coach; the youth sector will instead be managed by Rosario Argento (former Palermo youth chief in the 2000s) and Leandro Rinaudo (a Palermo native and former club player).

Players

Squad information
Players and squad numbers last updated on 1 February 2020.Appearances and goals are counted for domestic leagues (Serie A, Serie B and Serie D), national cups (Coppa Italia and Coppa Italia Serie D) and international cup (UEFA Cup) and correct as of 1 March 2020.Note: Flags indicate national team as has been defined under FIFA eligibility rules. Players may hold more than one non-FIFA nationality.

Transfers

Summer 2019

Pre-dissolution

In

Out

Other acquisitions

Other disposals

Total expenditure: €0

Total revenue: €2,900,000

Net income:  €2,900,000

New club

In

Post-summer transfers

Winter 2020

In

Out

Total expenditure: €35,000

Total revenue: €0

Net income:  €35,000

Pre-season and friendlies

Competitions

Overall

Serie D

League table

Results summary

Results by round

Matches

Serie D - Group I

Coppa Italia Serie D

Appearances and goals

|-
! colspan=14 style=background:pink; text-align:center| Goalkeepers
|-

|-
! colspan=14 style=background:pink; text-align:center| Defenders
|-

|-
! colspan=14 style=background:pink; text-align:center| Midfielders
|-

|-
! colspan=14 style=background:pink; text-align:center| Forwards

|}

Goalscorers

Clean sheets

Disciplinary record

Attendances

References

Palermo F.C. seasons
Palermo